The seventh and penultimate series of Gladiators aired in the UK from 5 September to 12 December 1998.

Gladiators

Episodes

 Maria scored five points at first, but one of Maria's fans challenged that Siren's chest plate was hit a second time in Dogfight, even though there was no signal. The fans urged a video review. After review, John Anderson declared the chest plate was hit a second time, and therefore Maria was awarded an additional five points. Ten points for this event.

References

1998 British television seasons
series seven